Galmoylestown Lower is a townland in County Westmeath, Ireland.

Galmoylestown Lower is one of 11 townlands of the civil parish of Stonehall in the barony of Corkaree in the Province of Leinster. 

The neighbouring townlands are: Blackmiles to the north, Galmoylestown Upper to the east, Garrysallagh to the south and Down, Larkinstown and Tyfarnham to the west.

In the 1911 census of Ireland there were 5 houses and 25 inhabitants in the townland.

References

External links
Map of Galmoylestown Lower at openstreetmap.org
Galmoylestown Lower at the IreAtlas Townland Data Base
Galmoylestown Lower at Townlands.ie
Galmoylestown Lower at The Placenames Database of Ireland

Townlands of County Westmeath